Peter Brugnani (born 28 October 1958) is a British bobsledder. He competed in the two man and the four man events at the 1984 Winter Olympics.

References

1958 births
Living people
British male bobsledders
Olympic bobsledders of Great Britain
Bobsledders at the 1984 Winter Olympics
Sportspeople from London
20th-century British people